was a town located on Amami Ōshima in Ōshima District, Kagoshima Prefecture, Japan.

As of 2003, the town had an estimated population of 6,856 and a density of 113.83 persons per km². The total area was 60.23 km².

On March 20, 2006, Kasari, along with the city of Naze, and the village of Sumiyō (also from Ōshima District), was merged to create the city of Amami.

References

External links
 Official website of Amami 

Dissolved municipalities of Kagoshima Prefecture